Cass County is a county located in the western part of the U.S. state of Missouri and is part of the Kansas City metropolitan area. As of the 2020 census, the population was 107,824. Its county seat is Harrisonville, however the county contains a portion of Kansas City, Missouri. The county was organized in 1835 as Van Buren County, but was renamed in 1849 after U.S. Senator Lewis Cass of Michigan, who later became a presidential candidate.

History
The Harrisonville area was long inhabited by speakers of the Dhegihan Siouan-language family: The Osage, Quapaw, Omaha, Ponca and Kansa tribes make up this sub-group. The Kansa tribal range extended southward from the Kansas-Missouri River junction as far as the northern edge of present-day Bates County, Missouri, taking in the sites of modern Pleasant Hill, Garden City, Archie and Drexel. On their southeastern border they were neighbors of the Osage. There is no evidence that either of these tribes ever had a truly permanent settlement in the territory of Cass County.

Other historical tribes in the area were reportedly Shawnee and Lenape (aka Delaware), whose tribes spoke related Algonquian languages. The Lenape had been pushed to the Midwest from their territory along the mid-Atlantic coast by continuous white encroachment.

In 1818 the United States had granted land to the Lenape in southern Missouri Territory, but they were forced to cede it back in 1825, after Missouri became a state. At that time, they were removed to a reservation in Kansas. Other Lenape had previously migrated south to Texas, seeking refuge in what was still Mexican territory after it gained independence from Spain. Those who remained in the Harrisonville area were close relatives of the Sauk, Fox and Kickapoo tribes.

The early camp meetings held by European-American settlers southwest of Harrisonville often attracted as many as 500 Indians, in addition to Europeans. They seemed to enjoy the enthusiastic religious services, accompanied by hymn singing and socializing, as much as the white settlers did. 

The first European-American settler on the site of modern Harrisonville was James Lackey in 1830. Other early settlers were Humphrey Hunt, John Blythe, and Dr. Joseph Hudspeth. Lackey was considered a "squatter," as he built a cabin and enclosed a small field on the tract of public land taken to establish the county seat.

The site of the town was fixed under an act of the Missouri General Assembly in 1835, by David Waldo of Lafayette County and Samuel Hink and William Brown, both of Jackson County. In the same year, the first court met for the county, known as Van Buren County. Justices James McClellan and William Savage met in McClellan's residence about three miles (5 km) southeast of Peculiar on September 14, 1835. William Lyon was appointed clerk of the court and county government was organized, including the establishment of Grand River Township.

In the spring of 1837 the town of Harrisonville was platted by Enoch Rice, Francis Prine and Welcome Scott, who had been appointed commissioners by the state legislature in the winter of 1836. These commissioners, in company with Martin Rice, the county surveyor, met at the home of John Cook on April 3, 1837, to resolve Lackey's preemption claim. In May they laid off the town in lots 3, 4, 5 and 6 of the northeast and northwest quarters of Section 4, Township 44N., Range 31W. Within these  there were to be four streets: Wall and Pearl running east to west, and Lexington and Independence going north and south, each less than 40 feet wide. Fleming Harris was appointed town commissioner on April 8, 1837. The first town lots were sold on June 12 of that year; those facing the public square sold at $20 each, the others at $10.

"Democrat" was strongly urged as a name for the new town but was finally rejected. The town was named after U.S. Representative Albert G. Harrison from Missouri. The first house within the town was erected by Jason L. Dickey in 1836. The first jail in Harrisonville and second for Cass County was established in 1838. Its site was 312 S. Independence. One of its successors is recognized among the state's historic sites.

On October 8, 1835, the first church in Harrisonville was organized. Its site was two miles southwest of town and it was known as Hopewell or New Hope Baptist.

Harrisonville eventually was served by railroad lines known as the Missouri Pacific and the Frisco. After a scandal in funding railroad construction by the issuance of bonds, three men involved in the swindle were shot and killed by a mob on April 24, 1872, when their train was stopped on a Katy railroad spur. This became known as the "Gunn City Massacre" because it took place near that city.

In 1857 Cass County had approved a large stock subscription for the Pacific Railroad Company, to support its construction in the area. This corporation later surrendered the bonds to the new Saint Louis and Santa Fe Railroad, from whence they were later assigned to the Land Grant Railroad & Construction Company of New York City. Residents of Cass County gained a court injunction in an effort to prevent the funding of these bonds, but by legal maneuvering and collusion, the company gained a new set of bonds, issued secretly. 

The populace was outraged, believing this maneuver was intended to benefit the holders of the now worthless bonds, by re-obligating the county to pay those same bonds. The county attorney, a judge of the county court, and a third man involved in the scandal were shot and killed while on a train stopped between Bryson, Missouri and Paola, Kansas. (It was in or near what is now known as Gunn City). Afterward some 41 men were arrested as suspects and prosecuted for these killings, but none was convicted. At the time of the shootings, a related mob burned a Republican newspaper owned by Porter J. Coston, in Harrisonville, Missouri.

By 1860, the year before the Civil War, 12 cities in Missouri had populations of approximately 2,500 or more. Harrisonville ranked 37th, with a population of 675. In 1863 the town was depopulated, as the United States forces pushed the people out in an effort to reduce any local support for insurgent guerrilla activity in the area. Most of the buildings were burned, the jail among them. Fort Harrisonville was a Union stronghold for a brief period in 1863 and provided protection for loyal Union families.

Some of the county's local history is presented at the Pleasant Hill Historical Society Museum, in Pleasant Hill on the northern edge of the county.

Geography

Adjacent counties
Jackson County  (north)
Johnson County  (east)
Henry County  (southeast)
Bates County  (south)
Miami County, Kansas  (west)
Johnson County, Kansas  (northwest)

Major highways
 Interstate 49
 U.S. Route 71
 Route 2
 Route 7
 Route 58
 Route 291

Demographics

As of the census of 2000, there were 82,092 people, 30,168 households, and 22,988 families residing in the county. There were 31,677 housing units at an average density of 45 per square mile (18/km2). The racial makeup of the county was 95.62% White, 1.42% Black or African American, 0.58% Native American, 0.48% Asian, 0.04% Pacific Islander, 0.50% from other races, and 1.35% from two or more races. Approximately 2.21% of the population were Hispanic or Latino of any race.

There were 30,168 households, out of which 38.10% had children under the age of 18 living with them, 63.60% were married couples living together, 9.10% had a female householder with no husband present, and 23.80% were non-families. 20.00% of all households were made up of individuals, and 8.50% had someone living alone who was 65 years of age or older.  The average household size was 2.69 and the average family size was 3.09.

In the county, the population was spread out, with 28.40% under the age of 18, 7.30% from 18 to 24, 30.20% from 25 to 44, 22.30% from 45 to 64, and 11.70% who were 65 years of age or older.  The median age was 36 years. For every 100 females there were 95.90 males.  For every 100 females age 18 and over, there were 92.90 males.

The median income for a household in the county was $49,562, and the median income for a family was $55,258. Males had a median income of $39,001 versus $26,174 for females. The per capita income for the county was $21,073.  About 4.20% of families and 5.80% of the population were below the poverty line, including 7.00% of those under age 18 and 5.20% of those age 65 or over.

Religion
According to the Association of Religion Data Archives County Membership Report (2010), Cass County is sometimes regarded as being on the northern edge of the Bible Belt, with evangelical Protestantism being the most predominant religion. The most predominant denominations among residents in Cass County who adhere to a religion are Southern Baptists (43.71%), Roman Catholics (17.42%), and United Methodists (11.07%).

2020 Census

Education

Public schools
School districts include:

Full K-12 school districts
 Archie R-V School District
 Belton 124 School District
 Drexel R-IV School District
 Harrisonville R-IX School District
 Holden R-III School District
 Kingsville R-I School District
 Lee's Summit R-VII School District
 Lone Jack C-6 School District
 Raymore-Peculiar R-II School District
 Sherwood Cass R-VIII School District
 Pleasant Hill R-III School District
 Midway R-I School District

Elementary school districts:
 East Lynne 40 School District
 Strasburg C-3 School District

Individual schools
Archie R-V School District – Archie
Cass County Elementary School (PK-06) 
Archie High School (07-12)
Belton 124 - Belton High School (10-12) - See article for other schools
Drexel R-IV School District – Drexel
Drexel Elementary School (K-06) 
Drexel High School (07-12)
East Lynne School District No. 40 – East Lynne
East Lynne Elementary School (PK-08)
Harrisonville R-IX School District – Harrisonville
Early Childhood Center (PK-K) 
Harrisonville Elementary School (01-05) 
McEowen Elementary School (04-05) 
Harrisonville Middle School (06-08) 
Harrisonville High School (09-12)
Midway R-I School District – Cleveland
Midway Elementary School (K-06) 
Midway High School (07-12)
Pleasant Hill R-III School District – Pleasant Hill
Pleasant Hill Primary School (PK-02) 
Pleasant Hill Elementary School (03-04) 
Pleasant Hill Intermediate School (05-06) 
Pleasant Hill Middle School (07-08) 
Pleasant Hill High School (09-12)
Raymore-Peculiar R-II School District – See article
Sherwood Cass R-VIII School District – Creighton
Sherwood Elementary School (K-05) 
Sherwood Middle School (06-08)
Sherwood High School (09-12)
Strasburg C-3 School District – Strasburg
Strasburg Elementary School (K-08)

Private schools
Hope Baptist Christian School – Pleasant Hill (01-12) – Baptist
Harrisonville Christian School – Harrisonville (PK-08) – Nondenominational Christian
Training Center Christian School – Garden City (PK-12) – Pentecostal
Heartland High School & Academy – Belton (PK-12) – Baptist
Blue Ridge Christian School South – Belton (PK-06) – Nondenominational Christian

Public libraries
Cass County Public Library

Politics

Local
Local politics are controlled by the Republican Party in Cass County.

State

Cass County is split between five legislative districts in the Missouri House of Representatives, four of which are held by Republicans and one by a Democrat.

District 33 – Chris Sander (R-Lone Jack).  Includes the communities of East Lynne, Gunn City, Harrisonville, Pleasant Hill, and Strasburg.

District 37 — Annette Turnbaugh (D-Grandview). Includes parts of the cities of Lake Winnebago and Raymore.

District 55 – Mike Haffner (R-Pleasant Hill).  Includes the communities of Garden City, Peculiar, and parts of Lake Winnebago and Raymore.

District 56 — Michael Davis (R-Kansas City).  Includes the communities of Belton, Cleveland, Drexel, Freeman, Lake Annette, and a tiny sliver of Kansas City.

District 57 — Rodger Reedy (R-Windsor). Includes the communities of Archie and Creighton.

All of Cass County is a part of Missouri's 31st District in the Missouri Senate and is currently represented by Rick Brattin (R-Harrisonville).

Federal
All of Cass County is included in Missouri's 4th Congressional District and is currently represented by Vicky Hartzler (R-Harrisonville) in the U.S. House of Representatives. Hartzler was elected to a sixth term in 2020 over Democratic challenger Lindsey Simmons.

Cass County, along with the rest of the state of Missouri, is represented in the U.S. Senate by Josh Hawley (R-Columbia) and Roy Blunt (R-Strafford).

Blunt was elected to a second term in 2016 over then-Missouri Secretary of State Jason Kander.

Political culture

Cass County was, up to World War II, solidly Democratic rooted in its strong secessionist sympathies during the Civil War. However, since 1952 it has become a strongly Republican county in presidential elections. Cass County strongly favored Donald Trump in both 2016 and 2020. The last Democratic candidate to carry the county was Jimmy Carter in 1976.

Voters in Cass County generally adhere to socially and culturally conservative principles which tend to influence their Republican leanings. Despite Cass County's longstanding tradition of supporting socially conservative platforms, voters in the county have a penchant for advancing populist causes. In 2018, Missourians voted on a proposition (Proposition A) concerning right to work, the outcome of which ultimately reversed the right to work legislation passed in the state the previous year. 66.33% of Cass County voters cast their ballots to overturn the law.

Missouri presidential preference primaries

2020
The 2020 presidential primaries for both the Democratic and Republican parties were held in Missouri on March 10. On the Democratic side, former Vice President Joe Biden (D-Delaware) both won statewide and carried Cass County by a wide margin. Biden went on to defeat President Donald Trump in the general election.

Incumbent President Donald Trump (R-Florida) faced a primary challenge from former Massachusetts Governor Bill Weld, but won both Cass County and statewide by overwhelming margins.

2016
The 2016 presidential primaries for both the Republican and Democratic parties were held in Missouri on March 15. Businessman Donald Trump (R-New York) narrowly won the state overall, but Senator Ted Cruz (R-Texas) carried a plurality of the vote in Cass County. Trump went on to win the nomination and the presidency.

On the Democratic side, former Secretary of State Hillary Clinton (D-New York) narrowly won statewide, but Senator Bernie Sanders (I-Vermont) won a majority in Cass County.

2012
The 2012 Missouri Republican Presidential Primary's results were nonbinding on the state's national convention delegates. Voters in Cass County supported former U.S. Senator Rick Santorum (R-Pennsylvania), who finished first in the state at large, but eventually lost the nomination to former Governor Mitt Romney (R-Massachusetts). Delegates to the congressional district and state conventions were chosen at a county caucus, which selected a delegation favoring Santorum. Incumbent President Barack Obama easily won the Missouri Democratic Primary and renomination. He defeated Romney in the general election.

2008
In 2008, the Missouri Republican Presidential Primary was closely contested, with Senator John McCain (R-Arizona) prevailing and eventually winning the nomination. However, former Governor Mitt Romney (R-Massachusetts) won a plurality in Cass County.

Then-Senator Hillary Clinton (D-New York) received more votes than any candidate from either party in Cass County during the 2008 presidential primary. Despite initial reports that Clinton had won Missouri, Barack Obama (D-Illinois), also a Senator at the time, narrowly defeated her statewide and later became that year's Democratic nominee, going on to win the presidency.

Communities

Cities

Archie
Belton
Cleveland
Creighton
Drexel
East Lynne
Freeman
Garden City
Harrisonville (county seat)
Kansas City (partly)
Lake Annette
Lake Winnebago
Lee's Summit (partly)
Peculiar
Pleasant Hill
Raymore
Strasburg

Villages

Baldwin Park
Gunn City
Riverview Estates
West Line

Census-designated places
Loch Lloyd
Martin City

Unincorporated Communities

Austin
Coleman
Daugherty
Dayton
Everett
Jaudon
Lisle
Lone Tree
Main City
Wingate

Notable people
 Robert C. Bell, federal judge
 Angelica Bridges, actress, model, and singer
 Delmer Brown, Japanologist* Emmett Dalton, of the bank-robbing Dalton Gang
 Carson Coffman, AFL player
 Chase Coffman, NFL tight end
 Paul Coffman, NFL player* Tyler Farr, Country music singer-songwriter
 Brutus Hamilton, decathlete and track and field coach
 Ben Hardaway, storyboard artist, animator, voice actor, gagman, writer, and director during the Golden Age of American animation
 Vicky Hartzler, U.S. Representative from Missouri (2011-present)
 Kevin Hern, U.S. Representative from Oklahoma (2018-present)
 Ewing Kauffman, businessman who founded Marion Laboratories and was the first owner of the Kansas City Royals
 Chris Koster, 41st Attorney General of Missouri (2009-2017)
 Tammy Faye Messner, televangelist
 Carrie Nation, leader of temperance movement
 Edward Capehart O'Kelley, man who killed Robert Ford, who killed Jesse James
 Tate Stevens, 2012 winner of The X Factor
 Oad Swigart, professional baseball player
 Glenn Wright, professional baseball player

See also
 List of counties in Missouri
National Register of Historic Places listings in Cass County, Missouri

References

Further reading
 Glenn, Allen. History of Cass County, Missouri (1917) online

External links
Cass County government link's website
 Digitized 1930 Plat Book of Cass County  from University of Missouri Division of Special Collections, Archives, and Rare Books

 
Missouri counties
1835 establishments in Missouri
Populated places established in 1835